Ambeļi Parish is an administrative territorial entity of Augšdaugava Municipality in the Latgale region of Latvia.

Towns, villages and settlements of Ambeļi Parish 
 Ambeļi

References 

 
Parishes of Latvia
Latgale